Rendy Saputra (born 16 September 1989) is an Indonesian professional footballer who plays as a left-back for Liga 1 club PS Barito Putera. Previously he played for Persiraja.

Club career

Persibo
In 2010, he joined Persibo Bojonegoro to play in Indonesian Premier League. In 2013 he left the club.

Persik
He joined Persik Kediri in 2014 to play in Indonesia Super League. He spent 1 year in this club.

Persiba
He was signed by Persiba Balikpapan in 2015. However, later in this year, Indonesian Leagues were suspended after only 1 league game, hence, he did not play any game.

PSCS Cilacap
In 2016, PSCS Cilacap signed him to play with them in ISC B. He helped the team to won the league, and scored in the final match.

Persegres
In 2017, he moved to Persegres to play with them in Liga 1. However he failed to help the team to avoid relegation by the end of the season.

Persibat
In 2018, Persibat Batang signed him. They competed in Liga 2. He helped the team to avoid relegation by the end of this season.

PSCS Cilacap
He rejoined PSCS Cilacap in 2019 to play in Liga 2. However, unlike in previous spell in 2016, this time he failed to help the team to advance to second round by finishing in fifth position in first round.

Persiraja
In 2020, he joined the newly promoted club, Persiraja Banda Aceh to play in Liga 1. He played in Persiraja first game of the season in match versus Bhayangkara F.C., coming from bench to substitute Agus Suhendra. This season was suspended on 27 March 2020 due to the COVID-19 pandemic. The season was abandoned and was declared void on 20 January 2021.

Barito Putera
Rendy was signed for Barito Putera to play in Liga 1 in the 2022–23 season.

Honours

Club
PSCS Cilacap
 Indonesia Soccer Championship B: 2016

References

External links
 

1989 births
Living people
Indonesian footballers
Association football defenders
Liga 1 (Indonesia) players
Liga 2 (Indonesia) players
Persibo Bojonegoro players 
Persik Kediri players
Persiba Balikpapan players
Persegres Gresik players 
Gresik United players
Kalteng Putra F.C. players
Persibat Batang players
PSCS Cilacap players
Persiraja Banda Aceh players
PS Barito Putera players
People from Palu
Sportspeople from Central Sulawesi